Events from the year 2001 in Belgium

Incumbents
Monarch: Albert II
Prime Minister: Guy Verhofstadt

Events

 March 27 - A train collision in Pécrot, Walloon Brabant causes 8 fatalities. 
 April 28 - Popular amusement park Walibi Waver reopens as Six Flags Belgium.
 June 3 - Aloys Jousten consecrated as bishop of Liège
 July 16 - Belgian Jacques Rogge elected President of the International Olympic Committee.
 September 11 - One Belgian dies in the September 11 attacks on the World Trade Center in New York City: Patrice Braut, killed on the 94th floor.
 November 6 - National airline company Sabena is declared bankrupt by the commercial court.

Publications
 Philippe Bragard and Vincent Bruch, Namur: une citadelle européenne (Namur, Les Amis de la Citadelle de Namur)
 Raymond van Uytven, Production and Consumption in the Low Countries, 13th-16th Centuries (Aldershot, Ashgate)

Art and architecture
 21 January to 22 April – Exhibition Pride and Joy: Children's Portraits in The Netherlands 1500-1700 held at Royal Museum of Fine Arts Antwerp.

Births
 27 February – Largie Ramazani, Belgian footballer
 25 October – Princess Elisabeth, Duchess of Brabant, eldest child of King Philippe and Queen Mathilde

Deaths
January
 January 1 - Remi Capoen (84), cyclist
 January 7 - Robert Hurbain (72), businessman 
 January 8 - Paul Vanden Boeynants (81), politician
 January 11 - Maurits Goossens (86), actor 
 January 19 - Pierre Soubry (69), businessman
 January 26 - Eric Rijckaert (57), doctor
 January 27 - Marie José of Belgium (94), Belgian princess and last Queen of Italy
 January 31 - Renaat Braem (90), architect

February
 February 22 - Piet Bergers (93), actor

March
 March 5 - Evrard de Limburg Stirum (73), mayor
 March 5 - Frans De Mulder (63), cyclist
 March 16 - Brasser (64), cartoonist

May
 May 3 - Ward Schroeven (88), athlete
 May 14 - Eugeen Uten (81), carillonneur and composer

June
 June 3 - Jean-Pierre De Decker (56), film director 
 June 15 - Hurey (63), cartoonist
 June 29 - Donald Madder (32), actor
 June 30 - Pol Appeltants (79), soccer-player

July
 July 8 - Kees Brug (78), singer and comedian
 July 12 - Jacques Vercruysse (71), athlete
 July 16 - Morris (77), cartoonist

August
 August 3 - Leo De Kesel (97), cleric
 August 18 - Roland Cardon (72), composer and conductor
 August 19 - Henri-François Van Aal (68), journalist and politician
 August 21 - Alfred Scokaert (80), mayor 
 August 24 - Bernard Heuvelmans (84), zoologist
 August 29 - Jacques Santkin (52), politician

September
 September 7 - Georges Mundeleer (80), politician
 September 8 - Paul Ooghe (102), last surviving Belgian soldier from World War 1
 September 26 - Albert Tiberghien (86), tax consultant

October
 October 1 - Alfons Borgers (82), mathematician
 October 15 - Lieve Baeten (46), children book writer

November
 November 15 - Robert Vanes (78), businessman and professor
 November 24 - Eddy Meeùs (75), entrepreneur, founder Walibi

December
 December 1 - Taf Wallet (99), painter and engraver
 December 15 - Paul Devlies (79), politician 
 December 22 - Pierre Cosemyns (71), boxer
 December 22 - Angèle Durand (76), singer and actress
 December 26 - Staf Permentier (81), comedian
 December 29 - Louis Waltniel (76), politician
 December 30 - Chaim Kreiswirth (83), Polish-Belgian rabbi

See also
1991 in Belgian television

References

 
Belgium
Years of the 21st century in Belgium
2000s in Belgium
Belgium